Stylidium inconspicuum is a dicotyledonous plant that belongs to the genus Stylidium (family Stylidiaceae). It is an annual plant that grows from 5 to 20 cm tall. Obovate or elliptical leaves, about 5-30 per plant, are scattered along the elongate, glabrous stem. The leaves are generally 4–8 mm long and 2–5 mm wide. Petioles and scapes are absent. Inflorescences are 5–8 cm long and produce pink or red flowers. S. inconspicuum is endemic to Java and is one of the few Stylidium species that are not native to Australia. Its habitat is recorded as being moist areas in grass-dominated fields at an altitude of 20–30 metres.

See also 
 List of Stylidium species

References 

inconspicuum
Endemic flora of Java
Carnivorous plants of Asia